The 2020 General Tire 150 was the sixth stock car race of the 2020 ARCA Menards Series and the 15th iteration of the event. The race was held on Saturday, July 11, 2020, in Sparta, Kentucky, at Kentucky Speedway, a 1.5-mile (2.41 km) tri-oval speedway. The race took the scheduled 100 laps to complete. At race's end, Ty Gibbs of Joe Gibbs Racing would take control in the late stages of the race to take his fourth career ARCA Menards Series win and his second of the season. To fill out the podium, Bret Holmes of Bret Holmes Racing and Michael Self of Venturini Motorsports would finish second and third, respectively.

Background 

Kentucky Speedway is a 1.5-mile (2.4 km) tri-oval speedway in Sparta, Kentucky, which has hosted ARCA, NASCAR and Indy Racing League racing annually since it opened in 2000. The track is currently owned and operated by Speedway Motorsports, Inc. and Jerry Carroll, who, along with four other investors, owned Kentucky Speedway until 2008. The speedway has a grandstand capacity of 117,000. Construction of the speedway began in 1998 and was completed in mid-2000. The speedway has hosted the Gander RV & Outdoors Truck Series, Xfinity Series, IndyCar Series, Indy Lights, and most recently, the NASCAR Cup Series beginning in 2011.

The race was held without fans in attendance due to the ongoing COVID-19 pandemic.

Entry list

Practice 
The only one-hour practice session would take place on Saturday, July 11.

Starting lineup 
ARCA would not hold a qualifying session for the race. Therefore, the current 2020 owner's standings would be determined for who got the pole. As a result, Michael Self of Venturini Motorsports won the pole.

Full starting lineup

Race results

References 

2020 ARCA Menards Series
NASCAR races at Kentucky Speedway
July 2020 sports events in the United States
2020 in sports in Kentucky